The Balıkesir–Bandırma Regional, numbered as B32, is a  long passenger train operating daily between Balıkesir and Bandırma. The train is a temporary replacement for the 6th of September Express and the 17th of September Express which operate only between İzmir and Soma, due to a tunnel collapse on the Manisa-Bandırma railway. Once construction on rebuilding the tunnel is complete and regular train service from İzmir to Bandırma returns, the Balıkesir-Bandırma Regional will be discontinued.

References

Passenger rail transport in Turkey